Jukka Kuoppamäki (b. 1 September 1942, Helsinki) is a Finnish singer, songwriter and priest for The Christian Community in Germany. He visits his summer house in Finland every year.

He is one of the most prolific Finnish popular singer-songwriters and has written over 1 500 songs for himself and other famous Finnish singers including Jari Sillanpää and Katri Helena. The texts tell about Finland ("Sininen ja valkoinen", Blue and white), love, and longing."Sininen ja valkoinen" (Blue and White) became a mega hit. He has lived in Germany since 1977 with his wife Sirpa Kuoppamäki and some of their seven children.

References

External links
Video with Kuoppamäki singing
Kukkasen valta

1942 births
Living people
Singers from Helsinki
20th-century Finnish male singers
Finnish songwriters
Finnish expatriates in Germany